The Iron Mountains (Železné hory) is a mountain range in the Czech Republic, which is a part of the Bohemian-Moravian Highlands. Their location is in the North of the Bohemian-Moravian Highlands. They have an area of 748 km², their average height is 480,8 metres, and their highest peak is Pešava at a height of 697 metres which is located exactly in the Sečská Upland, which is part of the Iron Mountains. But other sources state that the highest peak is Vestec, at a height of 668 metres.

Etymology
The mountain's name originates from the past metal abundance of the region, as it was the site of many mines of iron.

Geography
The mountain range can be characterised geographically, as an upland with a triangular shape, with a plateau from the southeast through to the northwest of the mountains.

Divisions
Chvaletická Plateau
Sečská Upland

Highest mountain peaks
Pešava 697 metres
Vestec 668 metres
Spálava 663 metres
U Chloumku 661 metres
Srní 653 metres
Zuberský vrch 650 metres
Polom 649 metres

Waters

The Iron Mountains are located in the basin of the river Elbe. The longest rivers in the area are Chrudimka and Doubrava. On the first river the following artificial water reservoirs are located: Seč I (the largest reservoir), Seč II, Křižanovice I, and Křižanovice II. Next to the reservoirs are located several holiday spots.

Settlements
In the mountains and around the area are located several villages, towns and cities: Heřmanův Městec, Třemošnice, Chrudim, Slatiňany and Hlinsko.

References

Mountain ranges of the Czech Republic
Chrudim District
Havlíčkův Brod District